The 2013–14 Texas A&M Aggies men's basketball team represented Texas A&M University in the 2013–14 college basketball season. The team's head coach is Billy Kennedy, who is in his third season at Texas A&M. The team plays their home games at the Reed Arena in College Station, Texas and will play in its second season as a member of the Southeastern Conference.

Before the season

Departures

Recruits

In addition to the three high school recruits signed, head coach Billy Kennedy also received a commitment from junior college transfer Jamal Jones (Lee College), a small forward from Searcy, Arkansas.

Roster

Schedule and results

|-
!colspan=12 style="background:#500000; color:#FFFFFF;"| Exhibition

|-
!colspan=12 style="background:#500000; color:#FFFFFF;"| Non-conference games

|-
!colspan=12 style="background:#500000; color:#FFFFFF;"| Conference games

|-
!colspan=12 style="background:#500000;"| SEC tournament

|-
!colspan=12 style="background:#500000;"| CBI

References

Texas A&M Aggies men's basketball seasons
Texas AandM
Texas AandM